Dianthus anatolicus  is a herbaceous perennial plant belonging to the family Caryophyllaceae natively occurring from Turkey to Tibet.

References

anatolicus
Flora of Asia